Fiona Box is an Australian radio broadcaster, television presenter and actress.

Career
Box's early career was spent in regional Australia working at stations 2MC/ROXFM Port Macquarie, 3TR Traralgon and 3GG Warragul. 

Box is known on television for her "standout" performance on Dancing with the Stars on the Seven Network in 2007 and guest appearances on Sunrise, The Project, Thank God You're Here and Have You Been Paying Attention?

In January 2009, Box joined Sunrise as weather presenter where she replaced David Brown and stayed in this position until December 2009.

In November 2010, it was announced that Box would join Jules Lund  as a co-host on Fifi and Jules across the Today Network leaving Friday's show open for Hamish and Andy to do their show. The show started in February 2011.

In November 2013, Box announced that she was going to co-host Fifi & Dave with Dave Thornton on Fox FM in 2014 replacing Jo Stanley and Matt Tilley. In 2016, Brendan Fevola joined the show and it was renamed Fifi, Dave and Fev. In January 2017, anchor Byron Cooke was added to the title of the show and it was renamed Fifi, Dave, Fev & Byron. Dave Thornton resigned from the show in September 2017 and the show was renamed to Fifi, Fev & Byron. In December 2020, Byron Cooke resigned from the show and was replaced by Nick Cody in January 2021. The show was renamed Fifi, Fev & Nick.

Box joined the cast of Neighbours in July 2016 as Brooke Butler. She made her debut on the show on 28 September 2016 and left at late November, her character returned in April 2017.

In February 2021, Box announced that she will be a contestant on Dancing with the Stars: All Stars on the Seven Network. She was eliminated first on 11 April 2021.

In February 2022, Box was announced as a Moomba Monarch alongside Peter Hitchener.

Personal life
Box was raised in the outer eastern suburbs of Melbourne, Victoria, Australia. She attended Tintern Grammar in Ringwood East and in her final year was appointed school captain. Box often returns to Tintern to speak with current students. Her brother is Augie March's keyboardist Kiernan Box.

On 19 November 2012, Box announced on live radio via her radio show Fifi and Jules that she was pregnant. On 17 December, it was reported that Grant Kenny was the father. In 2013, Box gave birth to a daughter.

On 10 February 2019, Box announced on Instagram, and later that week on The Project that she is expecting a second child via IVF. Later that year, she gave birth to her second daughter.

References

External links
 
 Fifi, Fev & Nick

Australian women comedians
Triple M presenters
Australian radio presenters
Living people
Australian women radio presenters
1977 births
Television personalities from Melbourne